Rashtriya Puraskar is an online portal launched by Government of India on 27 July 2022. By this web portal any citizen of India can nominate someone for National Award on a single platform.

Awards 

 Padma Awards
 Kaushalacharya Award
 National Award for Senior Citizens 
 National Award for Individual Excellence
 National Award for Individual Excellence
 National Awards for Institutions Engaged in Empowering Persons with Disabilities
 National Awards for Institutions Engaged in Empowering Persons with Disabilities
 National CSR Awards
 Nari Shakti Puraskar
 Subhash Chandra Bose Aapda Prabandhan Puraskar
 National Awards for e-Governance
 Sardar Patel National Unity Award
 National Awards for Outstanding Services in the Field of Prevention of Alcoholism and Substance Abuse
 Jeevan Raksha Padak

References

External links 
Official Website

Indian awards
Government of India
Ministry of Home Affairs (India)